Gyula Kristó (11 July 1939 – 24 January 2004) was a Hungarian historian and medievalist, member of the Hungarian Academy of Sciences.

Life 

Gyula Kristó was born in Orosháza on 11 July 1939. He studied at the József Attila University Szeged between 1957 and 1962.

Awards 

For the 1300-Year-Old Bulgaria (1981)
Albert Szentgyörgyi Prize (1994)

Works 

A vármegyerendszer kialakulása Magyarországon [The Development of the Counties in Hungary] (1988)
A magyar állam megszületése [The Birth of the Hungarian State]

Sources 

20th-century Hungarian historians
Historians of Hungary
Members of the Hungarian Academy of Sciences
University of Szeged alumni
1939 births
2004 deaths
People from Orosháza